Eros Capecchi (born 13 June 1986) is an Italian former professional road bicycle racer, who last rode for UCI WorldTeam . He took four professional wins during his career, including a stage of the 2011 Giro d'Italia.

Career
He took a notable victory at the Gran Premio di Lugano in 2012, dropping a dozen riders in the finale, and finished with a 4-second advantage over them. He joined  in 2020. He retired from competition at the end of the 2021 season, after his contract was not extended.

Major results

2004
 1st  Road race, National Junior Road Championships
2005
 3rd Ruota d'Oro
2006
 8th Down Under Classic
 9th Overall Tour de Luxembourg
2007
 1st Stage 1 (TTT) Settimana Ciclistica Lombarda
2008
 1st Overall Euskal Bizikleta
1st Stage 3
 9th Overall Deutschland Tour
2009
 6th Giro dell'Appennino
2011
 1st Stage 18 Giro d'Italia
 4th Overall Tour de San Luis
2012
 1st Gran Premio di Lugano
 4th Giro dell'Appennino
 5th Overall Tour of Beijing
 8th Overall Vuelta a Burgos
2013
 6th Overall Tour de Pologne
2014
 10th Overall Tour de Suisse
2016
 1st Stage 1 (TTT) Giro del Trentino 
 1st Stage 2 (TTT) Vuelta a Burgos

Grand Tour general classification results timeline

References

External links 

Eros Capecchi's profile on Cycling Base

1986 births
Living people
People from Castiglione del Lago
Italian male cyclists
Italian Giro d'Italia stage winners
Cyclists from Umbria
Sportspeople from the Province of Perugia
20th-century Italian people
21st-century Italian people